André Lurquin (born 27 August 1961) is a Belgian former professional racing cyclist. He rode in two editions of the Tour de France.

References

External links

1961 births
Living people
Belgian male cyclists
Sportspeople from Tournai
Cyclists from Hainaut (province)